Matthew Thomas Crowell (born 3 July 1984) is a Welsh retired footballer who last played for NSW Premier League side Central Coast Mariners Academy.

Club career

Southampton
Born in Bridgend, Crowell grew up in Coychurch. As a teenager he was part of the youth system at Swansea City before being persuaded to follow Swansea youth coach Malcolm Elias to Southampton at the age of 16 in 2000. Swansea took the case to the Football League appeals committee seeking compensation of £1.5 million. The committee later ordered Southampton to make an immediate payment of £100,000 to Swansea, as well as a further £100,000 when Crowell had made 10, 20, 30 and 40 appearances in the future and 20% of any future transfer fee that the club received for Crowell. Swansea chairman Neil McClure later stated "£500,000 is significantly more than Southampton ever offered at any stage and that must be regarded as satisfactory" However, Crowell never made a first team appearance at Southampton and was released in 2003.

Wrexham
After spending time on trial with Bristol Rovers, Crowell later joined Wrexham, having impressed in a trial spell, and made his professional debut for the club on 9 August 2003 as a substitute in place of Steve Thomas during a 0–0 draw with Chesterfield. In his third season at the Racecourse Ground he made six appearances in the club's Football League Trophy victory, beating Southend United 2–0 in the final. However, he later found himself plagued with injuries in his later years at the Racecourse Ground and, after playing on a six-month contract with the Welsh side in an attempt to show his fitness, he was released in January 2008 having made over 100 appearances for the club.

Non-league
In January 2008, Crowell signed for Northwich Victoria on non-contract terms. In July 2009, Crowell left Northwich. He attended a trial with NSW Premier League side Sydney Olympic, but later returned to Britain to sign for Altrincham on a short-term contract, stating that "It was hard at Northwich last season with the club's difficulties but I am pleased to join Altrincham".

Central Coast Mariners
In September 2009, Crowell joined A-League team Central Coast Mariners on a one-year deal until the end of the 2009–10 season. He made 13 appearances for the club before returning to England.

Return to Non-league
He then rejoined Altrincham before in December 2010 Farnborough announced that he had joined them, apparently on non-contract terms. He left the club after only two appearances.

Port Talbot Town
In May 2011, Crowell had a two-week trial with China's Chengdu Blades before he joined Welsh Premier League club Port Talbot Town in July 2011 after a trial. He played all of the club's league games prior to his next move.

CD Ourense
He signed a full-time contract with Spanish club CD Ourense in September 2011 where he made 20 appearances for the club.

Return to Port Talbot Town
In July 2012 Crowell returned to Wales and his former club Port Talbot Town ahead of the 2012/13 Welsh Premier League season. Crowell's first goal in his second spell at the club came in a 5–0 win away at Aberystwyth FC where he scored a penalty.

Central Coast Mariners Academy
In March 2013 Crowell signed for the Central Coast Mariners Academy, feeder seed for Central Coast Mariners FC of the A-League where he had a previous stint in the 2009–10 season.

Retirement 
Crowell retired from professional football in August 2019

International career
A former captain of the Wales under-15 side, Crowell later went on to represent Wales at under-17 and under-19 levels. He has also played numerous times for the Wales U21 side and has also scored a screamer with his left foot for the side, against Azerbaijan U21 in 2004.

Career statistics

References

External links

Central Coast Mariners profile

1984 births
Living people
Footballers from Bridgend
Welsh footballers
Wales youth international footballers
Wales under-21 international footballers
Southampton F.C. players
Wrexham A.F.C. players
Northwich Victoria F.C. players
Altrincham F.C. players
Central Coast Mariners Academy players
English Football League players
National League (English football) players
A-League Men players
Central Coast Mariners FC players
National Premier Leagues players
Association football midfielders